The Statesman Newspaper is a Ghanaian newspaper printed weekly in Ghana by the Graphic Communications Group. It is the oldest mainstream newspaper in Ghana. It has been in circulation since 1949.

Past contributors
Boakye Agyarko - weekly column titled Letters from America

References

Mass media in Ghana
Newspapers published in Ghana